The enzyme alkylmercury lyase (EC 4.99.1.2) catalyzes the reaction

an alkylmercury + H+  an alkane + Hg2+

This enzyme belongs to the family of lyases, specifically the "catch-all" class of lyases that do not fit into any other sub-class.  The systematic name of this enzyme class is alkylmercury mercury(II)-lyase (alkane-forming). Other names in common use include organomercury lyase, organomercurial lyase, and alkylmercury mercuric-lyase.

The enzyme converts methyl mercury to the much less toxic elemental form of the metal.

References

 

EC 4.99.1
Enzymes of known structure